7 Camelopardalis is a multiple star system in the northern circumpolar constellation of Camelopardalis. It is located approximately 370 light years from the Sun, as determined from its parallax. This system is visible to the naked eye as a faint, white-hued star with a combined apparent visual magnitude of 4.43. It is moving closer to the Earth with a heliocentric radial velocity of −10 km/s.

The primary member of the group, designated component A, is a single-lined spectroscopic binary system with a circular orbit and a period of 3.88 days. The visible component of this pair is a magnitude 4.49 A-type main-sequence star with a stellar classification of A1 V. It has 3.2 times the mass of the Sun and is spinning with a projected rotational velocity of 40 km/s. The star is radiating 222 times the Sun's luminosity from its photosphere at an effective temperature of 9,226 K.

The magnitude 7.90 component B has an orbital solution with the Aa/Ab pair, which yields a period of 284 years and an eccentricity of 0.74. However, Drummond (2014) found the data to be discordant and instead determined that they are an optical pair with no physical association. The fourth member, component C, is a magnitude 11.30 star at an angular separation of  along a position angle of 242° from the primary, as of 2003.  It shares a common proper motion with the primary star.

References

A-type main-sequence stars
Spectroscopic binaries
4
Camelopardalis (constellation)
Durchmusterung objects
Camelopardalis, 07
031278
023040
1568